The 58th Annual Miss Universe Puerto Rico pageant was held at the Centro de Bellas Artes de Santurce in San Juan, Puerto Rico on August 29, 2012.

Bodine Koehler, who won the title of Miss Universe Puerto Rico 2012, crowned her successor, Miss Arecibo, Monic Marie Pérez as Miss Universe Puerto Rico 2013, who then represented Puerto Rico at Miss Universe 2013 on November 9, 2013 in Moscow.

Also, the contestants from Puerto Rico for the Miss Intercontinental 2013, Miss Supranational 2013, Miss Continente Americano 2013, and Top Model of the World Puerto Rico 2013 competitions were chosen.

Results

Placements

Miss Universe Puerto Rico 2013 Mall Tour
The delegates of the Miss Universe Puerto Rico 2013 edition, made a summer mall tour on the most importants malls of the island. During the tour the delegates competed on different mini competitions and presented JcPenney's summer season clothes on the runway. The mall tour mini competition awards were given as follow:

Gala de Premios (Special Awards Gala)
It took place on August 23, it was hosted by Puerto Rican TV host Alexandra Fuentes. These awards were given:

These awards were given during the pageant on August 29:

Contestants
Here is a list of the official 32 contestants:

Notes
 Miss Arroyo, Genesis Davila, later competed at Miss Mundo de Puerto Rico 2014 representing Arroyo where she won the title and represented Puerto Rico at Miss World 2014.
 Miss Bayamón, Stephanie Román, competed at Miss Universe Puerto Rico 2011 representing Bayamón. She finished as 1st runner-up. She competed at Miss Continente Americano 2011 but didn't qualify and later represented Dorado at Miss Universe Puerto Rico 2016 where she finished as 5th Runner-Up. Additionally she competed at Miss Mundo de Puerto Rico 2016 where she finished as 1st Runner-Up. She later assumed the title of Miss Mundo de Puerto Rico 2016 after Stephanie Del Valle was crowned Miss World 2016.
 Miss Cayey, Desireé Del Río, competed at Miss Universe Puerto Rico 2011 representing Ciales. She finished as 3rd runner-up. She later competed at Miss International 2011 and finished as 3rd runner-up. Sha later went on to compete at Miss Supranational 2013, she placed on the Top 20 and won the Miss Photogenic award.
 Miss Fajardo, Patricia Corcino, competed at Miss Universe Puerto Rico 2010 representing Caguas, but didn't classify. She later went on to compete on Nuestra Belleza Latina 2011 where she finished on the 6th place.
 Miss Adjuntas, Laura Irizarry, won the Elite Model Look Puerto Rico 2010 and represented Puerto Rico in China.
 Miss Yauco, Natalia Leyva, was chosen to represent Puerto Rico at Reinado Internacional del Banano 2012 in Ecuador. She finished in Top 5.
 Miss Toa Alta, Ariana Diaz, competed at Top Model of the World 2013. She placed as Semi-finalist. Ariana was chosen to compete after the resignation of Miss Orocovis, Amanda Ortiz.
 Miss Corozal, María Nelly Vicioso, later competed at Nuestra Belleza Latina 2013 where she placed in the Top 30. She then competed at Miss Dominican Republic 2013, representing Santo Domingo Este, where she placed in the Top 13.

Historical significance
 Arecibo won Miss Universe Puerto Rico for the first time.
 The following municipalities also made the semi-finals last year were Aguas Buenas, Arroyo, Cayey, Mayagüez, Toa Alta, and Toa Baja.
 Toa Baja placed for the fourth consecutive year.
 Las Piedras last placed in 2002.
 Lares last placed in 2004.
 Fajardo last placed in 2007.
 Adjuntas and Arecibo last placed in 2009.
 Dorado and Rincón last placed in 2010.
 Canóvanas, Corozal, and Humacao last placed in 2011.

References

2012 in Puerto Rico
Puerto Rico 2013
2013 beauty pageants